Ashin Nandamālābhivaṃsa (born 22 March 1939), commonly known by his position as Rector Sayadaw, is a Burmese Theravada Buddhist monk who currently serves as the rector of Sitagu International Buddhist Academy, and an associate head of Shwegyin Nikaya. He also served as the rector of the International Theravada Buddhist Missionary University.

Early life and education 
He was born on March 22, 1939, in the village of Nyaungbin, in Singu, Mandalay, to parents San Hla and Khin and he received a grounding in Pali and Buddhist scripture from his brother.

He went to the monastic school when he was six in 1945 and became a novice monk at Sagaing Hills at the age of around ten to twelve in 1950–1951, under the patronage of U Canda (Sankin Sayadaw), head of the Vipassanā monastery. Later, he was given the Dharma name “Nandamāla”.

At the age of around thirteen to fourteen, he passed three levels of Abhidharma at the Pathamabyan examination held in 1953.

Three years later in 1956, he passed the government Dhammācariya examination with distinction in two subjects, and received the title of Sāsanadhaja sirīpavara dhammācariya.

In 1958, he founded the Mahasubodharum monastery together with his brothers, and served as essence instructor and administrator.

At the age of around twenty to about twenty-one in 1960–1961, he passed the third class of Sakyasīhasāmaṇe examination with the first grade, and was awarded the title of Sāsanālaṅkāra.

Monkhood career
In 1960 when he was 21, Nandamala the novice was ordained as a monk under Sankin Sayadaw at the Sāsanamañjarī ordination hall of Mahasubodharum monastery.

He passed the Cetiyaṅgaṇa examination (Yangon) and Sakyasīha examination (Mandalay) in 1962 and 1964 respectively. Then he became a Sāsanadhaja Dhammācariya Vinaya Pali specialist.

In 1967, he served as a compiler of Tipitaka dictionary of Pali to Myanmar.

He completed his master's degree in Buddhist studies from Kelaniya University of Colombo, Sri Lanka, with the thesis "The Exposition of True Meaning with Critical Introduction to Text."

In 1995, he was conferred the title of Aggamahāganthavācakapaṇḍita (senior instructor or lecturer) by the Burmese government. This was followed by receiving the title of Agga Maha Pandita in 2000.

He got a doctoral degree from the Magadha University of India in 2003, with thesis "Jainism in Buddhist literature."

Since the death of Ashin Silanandabhivamsa in 2005, Sayadaw served as the rector of International Theravada Buddhist Missionary University until his retirement on 13 November 2019. Sayadaw also serves as the rector of Sitagu International Buddhist Academy.

On 4 January 2020, the government offered him the highest Pariyatti title of Abhidhajamahāraṭṭhaguru.

Publications 
The published works of Nandamālābhivamsa include:

 The Hundred Verses on the Life of the Master (1967)
 The Biography of the Master (1972)
 The 90 Years of Life of Daw Malayee (1974)
 The Life and Literature of Shwehintha Sayadaw (1979)
 The Exposition of True Meaning (Paramattha dīpanī) with Critical Introduction to the Text (Thesis for the degree of Master of Philosophy)
 The Hundred Verses on the Life of the Thera (1987)
 Buddhism and Vegetarianism (1990)
 The Three Meritorious Actions in Buddhism (1992)
 Mettā (1994)
 The Fundamental Abhidhamma (including a chapter on the History of Abhidhamma) (1997)
 A Study of Jainism according to Buddhist Literature (Thesis for the degree of Ph.D., 2002)
 The Dhamma Mirror (2004) 
 Patthann Myat Desana (Discourse on Paṭṭhāna) (2004)
 The Path to Happiness (2010)
 Eight and One (2012)
 The Exits of Mind (2012) 
 Buddha’s Advice to Rahula (2012)
 Analytical Study of Vedanā (2012)
 Samatha and Vipassanā (2014)
 Bhikkhunī Sāsana in Theravāda Tradition (Mar 2016)

References

External links 
 Facebook in Burmese
 Website in Burmese 
 His English translated books

1939 births
Theravada Buddhist monks
Burmese Theravada Buddhists
Burmese Buddhist monks
Living people
People from Mandalay Region
Alumni of the University of Kelaniya
20th-century Buddhist monks
21st-century Buddhist monks
20th-century Burmese people
21st-century Burmese people
Burmese recipients of Agga Maha Pandita
Burmese recipients of Abhidhaja Maha Rattha Guru
Recipients of Abhivaṃsa